Magnetic north is the direction in which a compass needle points; see Magnetic declination and North magnetic pole.

Magnetic north may also refer to:
 Magnetic North (Hopesfall album), 2007
 Magnetic North (Aqualung album), 2010
 Magnetic North (Iain Archer album), 2006
 The Magnetic North, a British band
 Magnetic North Orchestra, a Norwegian jazz orchestra
 Magnetic North Theatre Festival in Canada
 An arc of Ultimate X-Men written by Brian K. Vaughan